Alphaeus Hunton Jr. (1903–1970) was a civil right activist. He was executive director of the Council on African Affairs.

Life 
He was born on 18 September 1903, in Atlanta. His family moved to Brooklyn. He graduated from Howard University, and Harvard University. He taught at Howard University. He was a leader in the  National Negro Congress. He edited New Africa, and Spotlight on Africa. He contributed to the Daily Worker and Freedom. 

In 1941, he was accused of being a communist by House Un-American Activities Committee. In 1943, he left Howard and joined the Council on African Affairs. In 1960 he moved to Conakry. He moved to Accra, to work with W. E. B. Du Bois, on his Encyclopedia Africana. In 1967, he moved to Lusaka. He wrote for Mayibuye. He died on January 13, 1970.

Works 

 Decision in Africa: Sources of Current Conflict. New York: International Publishers, 1957.

Further reading 

 William Alphaeus Hunton: A Pioneer Prophet Of Young Men ,

References 

1903 births
African-American activists
Howard University alumni
Harvard University alumni
Howard University faculty
1970 deaths